Double-T armature - Shape of armature used in some motors and generators. Two 'T' shapes extending from axis.

Its use in early Siemens dynamos caused a pulsing variable DC output which was improved upon by the Gramme dynamo.

Another improvement is the three-pole armature ('triple-T' armature) as in this image :

See also
 Brushed DC electric motor

References

Electric power systems components
Electromagnetic components